Françoise d'Amboise (9 May 1427 – 4 November 1485) was a French Roman Catholic declared "blessed" and a duchess consort of Brittany.

She was born in the castle of Thouars. She was the daughter of the rich noble Louis d'Amboise, prince of Talmont and Viscount of Thouars, and Louise-Marie de Rieux. To escape from the violence of the times, she fled with her mother to the court of Brittany, which resided in Vannes and, later on, in Nantes. At the age of three she had been engaged to Peter, the second son of John V, Duke of Brittany, for political reasons. She married him at the age of fifteen, in 1442.

In 1450, after the unexpected death of Pierre's elder brother, her husband came to rule Brittany as Pierre II. Françoise d'Amboise became the Duchess of Brittany and had a discrete but active share in governing Brittany. She came to help the poor and the sick. She had also a strong feeling about justice. Her husband died of a disease in 1457. She then entered into a conflict with King Louis XI who wanted to marry her. A widow without children, she founded, together with Jean Soreth, the first monastery of the Carmelites in France, in 1463.

She took the veil of a nun in 1468, when entering the convent of the Three Maries at Vannes. She died in Nantes, at the monastery of the Carmelite nuns.

In 1863, she was beatified by Pope Pius IX.

Notes

References 
 
 J.-L. Chalnel, Histoire de la Touraine, 1841, tome IV.
 Eugène Lafolye, Compte des dépenses de Françoise d'Amboise, Editeur Vannes, 1889.
 

Carmelite nuns
Venerated Carmelites
1427 births
1485 deaths
French beatified people
Medieval Breton saints
Francoise
Francoise d'Amboise
15th-century Breton women
15th-century Christian saints
Breton beatified people